Andrea Victoria Aguilera Paredes (born April 27, 2001) is an Ecuadorian model, beauty pageant titleholder who won the national title of Miss Grand Ecuador 2021 for the first time under national contest . She represented Ecuador at Miss Grand International 2021 held Bangkok, Thailand on December 4, where she was crowned as the 1st Runner-Up. Later was appointed Miss Supranational Ecuador 2023, and will represent Ecuador at Miss Supranational 2023 ,pageant held in Poland

Early life and education 
Aguilera was born in Ventanas, Ecuador on April 27, 2001, aside from Ventanas and Guayaquil, she has lived in other parts of Ecuador including Quito and Cuenca.                                                               
Aguilera is knowed by represented her province in several beauty pageants in her country. She was studying medicine at the University of Guayaquil, in 2021 paused the carrer by the pageant. After the pageant, Aguilera enter to the six season of Soy el Mejor 2022, where she left the reality after two presentations, because three jugdes made derogatory comments about her participation in Miss Grand International. In 2022 began studying bachelor's degree International Business in the UEES.

Pageantry

Reina de Los Rios 2019 
Aguilera began her pageantry carrer in 2018 after she won the right to represent Ventanas in the traditional contest of your province Reina de Los Rios. Aguilera joined in September 16 where she was announced as contest. On  September 27, 2019, Aguilera won the provincial pageant.

Miss Earth Ecuador 2019 
Before to competed in Reina de Los Rios. Aguilera joined at the national pagent for Miss Earth, where she finished as Miss Earth Ecuador - Fire (3rd Runner-Up) in the night gala.

Concurso Nacional de Belleza Ecuador 2020 
In December 2019 Aguilera won the contest Miss New Model Maganize 2020, pageant where the winner joined directly at national contest CNB Ecuador. In February 2020 she was announced as one of 20  was selected in the casting to compete for the title of CNB Ecuador 2020. But she decide to withdraw of the competition due to the COVID-19 pandemic. As contestant withdrawn she had the opportunity return the next edition automatically.

Miss Grand Ecuador 2021 
Aguilera automatically was contestant for the pageant, because she decide return for compete by the title this year. She was as one of 6 contestant for the 1st edition of Miss Grand Ecuador 2021. During the competition, Aguilera won the following awards & challenges:

  Miss Make Up
  Miss Catwalk
  Be a Miss
 Miss Multimedia
 Miss Cielo
On June 26, 2021, she represented Los Rios at Miss Grand Ecuador 2021 at TC Televisión in Guayaquil, Ecuador where she advanced to the Top 3 and then was named  as the winner, besting five other candidates.

Miss Grand International 2021 
As Miss Grand Ecuador, Aguilera won the right to represented Ecuador at Miss Grand International competition, On December 4, at the final show, Aguilera was advanced to Top 20. After that, at the swimsuit competition where advanced to Top 10.

During the Top 10 speech her message was:

After the Evening gown and Speech, Aguilera advanced into the Top 5. During the Top 5 question and answer round her question was  "There are many problems in the world right now, such as human rights and the economy. Who would you choose and why?" She answered:
  
After that and several interviews due to the tie, she was crowned as the 1st Runner-Up of the contest, becomes the first Ecuadorian to reach the highest placement for the first time for his country.

References

External links
 

2001 births
Living people
Ecuadorian beauty pageant winners
Miss Grand International
Miss Grand International contestants
People from Ventanas